Although Buddhism has almost disappeared from Kerala, historians say that in ancient times Kerala had a strong position and its cultural influence can still be seen in the people of Kerala. It is believed that Buddhism reached Kerala in its infancy. There is historical evidence that Buddhist monks came to Kerala in the 6th century BC. The teachings of Ashoka and many of the local kings of Kerala and the many works of the Sangam period show the influence of Buddhism in Kerala. Emperor Ashoka sent Buddhist monks to all directions and a group of Buddhist monks came here directly from Sri Lanka. Ashoka was an emperor who longed to conquer the whole of India. Due to his military prowess and the religious tolerance of the Chera kings in Kerala, Buddhism was widely accepted. The moral struggle waged by Buddhist monks against human sacrifice, animal sacrifice and other rituals was the first social reform in Kerala against the customs of Dravidian culture. Buddhism, which changed the cultural fabric of Kerala and revolutionized social life, was later reduced to a nominal one.
 As a revolutionary change in the field of education, they established temples and numerous clinics in all corners. Their treatment centers, known as medical centers, brought about a radical change for Keralites who were practicing witchcraft at that time.

History

The Cheras are referred to as Keralaputras in the inscriptions of Ashoka. This may have been the sons of Chera or the king of Chera who was considered a saint and described as Buddha. In any case, the early kings of Kerala were converts to Buddhism and Jainism. 

The oldest and most reliable document linking Kerala to Buddhism is the Dharma inscriptions carved by Emperor Ashoka on the Girnar rock in Gujarat. It says:

BCE Ashoka's inscriptions show that Buddhism existed in Kerala and other parts of South India as early as the 2nd century. It has been proved that Theravada Buddhism reached Kerala in the 3rd century. The discovery of Buddha statues at Kozhikode, Mavelikkara, Karumadi, Karunagapally, Maruthurkulangara, Bharanikkavu, Pallikkal and Kottapuram is a case in point. Historically, Hindu temples in many places were Buddhist monasteries. Many of the idols were broken and thrown into nearby ponds. This is an indication of an occupation and seizure by force.

Emperor Ashoka sought to spread the message of Buddhism throughout India even before preaching in countries overseas. This is stated in the Muski inscriptions. The name of Kerala is not mentioned but Kerala will be included in it as it is spread all over India. There are records of hospitals being set up, wells being dug and medicinal and chola trees being planted. The Mahavamsa, a Buddhist chronicle, records that the Buddha himself visited South India and Ceylon more than once.
The monks who came to Kerala to spread Buddhism did not come only from Sri Lanka but on the contrary, Buddhists came to Kerala through the disciples of Mahasangharakshithan, a prominent Buddhist teacher sent by Ashoka to propagate his religion in Gujarat and Maharashtra.

Not only the Hinayana people but also the Mahayana and Vajrayana theorists grew up in Kerala. AD Meghavarnan, who ruled Sri Lanka from 240 to 253, and Makala, who ruled from 253 to 275, were the ones who gave the opportunity to the Mahayana monks. However, during the reign of King Godakadayan from 305 to 316, 60 Mahayana Buddhist monks were deported on charges of heresy. All of them came and settled in Kerala. All these 60 sages worked tirelessly for the rise of Mahayana Buddhism in Kerala.

Works of Sangha period refer to the efforts made by monks to spread the Buddhist message. The Manimekhalai is a Buddhist work.According to a 1927 thesis of Rao Bahadur Krishnaswāmi Aiyangar, the Manimekalai contains "nothing that may be regarded as referring to any form of Mahayana Buddhism, particularly the Sunyavada as formulated by Nagarjuna". In contrast, in 1978, C.N. Kandaswami stated there is a lot of internal evidence that "Manimekalai explains Mahayana Buddhism, and champions its cause". The most famous Buddhist temple in South India was in Vanchi. Arguments are still being made as to whether this Vanchi is in Thiruvanchikulam  or in Kodungallur. Legend has it that a Pallibanaperumal from Kerala left the country as a Buddhist monk. Related to this legend are the Kilirur Temple in Kottayam Taluk and the Nilamperur Temple in Alappuzha Taluk. There are monuments of Pallibanaperumal in both the temples.

Many temples such as Kilirur, Kuttamperur, Kodungallur and Arthunkal are believed to have been Buddhist temples at one time. A meditation idol of Buddha has been found at the Paruvassery Durga Temple in Thrissur. Similarly, many Buddhist idols found in Kunnathoor, Karunagappilly taluks, Mavelikkara and Ambalapuzha taluks show the spread of Buddhism in Kerala.

The decline of Buddhism began in the early 8th century. It can be seen from the descriptions of the Chinese travelers that it began to weaken by the seventh century. However, the poems in Tirunizhal mala show which was written in the 12th century, show that Kerala was still not delineated under the chathurvarnya system.  With the introduction of Brahmanism, the kings turned against Buddhism. As a result, the influence of Buddhism gradually waned. During the reign of Vaishnava Kulasekara, Buddhism almost completely disappeared in the 11th century.

Sree Moolavasam (near Thrikkunnapuzha) was a famous Buddhist center in Kerala. It is said that the Ay king Vikramaditya Varaguna protected the famous Sreemoolavasam Buddhist pilgrimage center. He donated a large piece of land to the temple. The Mangalacharana in the Sasana, which glorifies the Buddha and Dharma, is remarkable. However, by the 10th century, the center had lost its name.

Buddha Statues in Kerala

Buddhist statues are believed to have been destroyed or Hinduized during the Hindu rule. But rare Buddha statues have been found intact. They are mainly found at Mavelikkara, Maruthur, Kulangara, Karumadi, Bharanikkavu, Kunnathoor and Pallikkal in Kollam district.
 The idol in the Pallikkal Temple was headless. Today it is preserved in a museum in Thiruvananthapuram. The head is made of a similar stone and assembled. The idol of Mavelikkara was found in a field near the Kandiyur Shiva Temple.  According to the historian S. N. Sadasivan,  Until  A.D. 450, it was the main deity in the Kandiyur Shiva Temple. All the statues are carved in stone. They are all in the form of yogasana, is 2–3 feet long from the feet to the turban. Most of the idols are said to be seated in a lotus position in meditation. Anthropology records that the statue at Maruthur Kulangara is the oldest of its kind. It was built in the 7th century. It was found in a pond near the temple. The black meditative statue found near Thottappilly in Ambalapuzha is called Karumadikuttan. The Buddha statue found near the guest house at Mavelikkara is placed on the public road near the Sri Krishnaswamy Temple. The Buddha statue received from Bharanikawa dates back to AD. 9 century. P. C. Alexander and S. N.Sathasivan are the two historians who have written extensively about Buddhism in Kerala. According to them, these Buddha statues were made in the Anuradhapura style.

Cultural significance
The influence of Buddhism in Kerala culture is huge.  Style of calling Schools by  Ezhuthu Palli and Pallikoodam are under the influence of Buddhism. Until the end of the 18th century, the word 'Namostu Jinatam' (Namotu Chinatam) was used in the beginning of education training in Kerala in praise of the Buddha. Meaning a prayer to Jinan or Buddha. At that time, the entire text of Kerala was called Nanam Manam. It is an abbreviation of the Pali verse Naanam, Monam, Ettanam, Thuvanam, Jeenam, Ennanam, Thanam and Ummanam. These are the eight  noble ways: the right perspective, the right goal, the right speech, the right action, the right way of life, the right focus, the right concentration, and the right effort.

Ayurveda

One of the most important cornerstones of the Buddhist movement was their integration of medicine into social life. They reached out to all corners of society through hospitals, medicine, Buddhist monasteries and chaityas. They imparted the power of knowledge and research to a people who had hitherto practiced only witchcraft and some wild plants. Ashoka himself established medicinal plants in many places. Buddhist physicians were at the forefront of eye surgery and medicine. The famous Buddhist monk Bedanta Nagarjuna (and physician) came to Thiruvizha in Cherthala after studying at the center for 18 years and there he is reported to have taught medicine and cared for the sick. The Buddhist monks were able to play a major role in making medicine universal by imparting the knowledge of medicine to the natives. This is the reason why Ayurveda is more prevalent in Kerala today than in other states.

The most invaluable contribution of Bedanta Nagarjuna is his work on the chemical formulas, 'Rasa vaiseshika sutra'. It was written by his disciple and Buddhist monk Narasimhan. It is said that it was the tireless efforts of the same Narasimhan that gave the Keralite families a profound knowledge of herbs.

Architecture
Vastushastra, the system of architecture of Temples and Palaces were introduced to Kerala by Buddhist engineers. Although many temples in Kerala were later converted to Hinduism, the architecture remained intact.

Rituals of temples

Temple rituals such as Vedikettu, Katina, Parayeduppu, Padayani, Pooram, Kettukazhcha and Rathodsavam are Buddhist offerings. Along with the Buddhist monasteries, they ran schools and health care centers.

List of traditions and practices of potential Buddhist origin 
 Theyyam, a popular ritual form of worship of North Malabar in Kerala (predominantly in the Kolathunadu area) as well as in Southern Karnataka (such as Coorg or South Canara). The word is probably a variant of Dheivam or Theivam that means God in Malayalam and Tamil.
 Pallipana, a ritual performed by velans (sorcerers) every 12 years during the Arattu festival at Ambalappuzha Sri Krishna Temple

 Pooram Padayani, a festival at Neelamperoor Palli Bhagavathi Temple in praise of Goddess Vanadurga, which is considered similar to the Buddhist festival seen by Fahian at Patna, Bihar. The main feature is the display of exquisitely decorated effigies named Kettukazhcha. Padayani is a symbolic victory march of Goddess Kali after vanquishing Darika.
 Kettukazhcha at Chettikulangara Devi Temple, where the main deity is Goddess Bhadrakali.
 Kodungallur Bharani festival in honour of the deity Kodungallur Bhagavathy (Bhadrakali) who is considered the legendary Kannagi of Tamil mythology and who is also revered as Goddess Pattini by Sri Lankan Sinhalese Buddhists.
 Valiyakulangara Kettukazhcha at Valiyakulangara Devi Temple
 Thalappoli festival at Kodungallur Bhagavathy Temple

Famous Buddhists from Kerala

Amarasimhan
Author of Amarakosa. He lived in Thakazhi near Mavelikkara. Amarakosham was written by him after living in Thakazhi for 20 years. He then went to Sri Lanka, where he received the title of Simhan and later to Vikramaditya's country.Amarasinghe was one of the 'Navaratnas' who lived during the reign of King Vikramaditya.

Chithala Chathanar

Chathanar or Chithala Chathanar, cītala cāttanār) was the Tamil poet who composed the epic Manimekalai. A total of 11 verses of the Sangam literature have been attributed to Satthanar, including verse 10 of the Tiruvalluva Maalai. The famous kings of the Sangam period were Buddhists. Chilapathikaram, a famous group work, is one that reveals the Buddhist influence of the time. Chithalai Chathanar was the Buddhist monk who wrote Manimekhala, the successor to Silapathikaram. The theme of Manimekhala is about converting from Jainism to Buddhism. He was a contemporary of Cheran Senguttuvan and was believed to have practiced Buddhism. He has sung in praise of the Pandyan king Chittira Maadatthu Thunjiya Nanmaran in the Sangam work of Purananuru.

Aryadevan
Aryadevan was a Buddhist scholar who lived in the 5th-6th centuries. He was a follower of Nagarjuna and wrote Chathusika. He lived at Sembapuram (present day Srangapuram) in Kodungallur. Huang Sang, a Chinese traveler, describes Aryan.

Pallivana perumal
Palli Vanapperumal or Pallibana Perumal was a famous king of the Cheravamsa dynasty based in Mahodayapuram (present day Kodungallur). Researchers have established that he lived in the 15th-16th centuries. He was the last propagandist of Buddhism in Kerala. His first temple was the Palli Bhagavathi Temple near Kodungallur. However, he left Kodungallur for Kuttanad and built many Buddhist temples and chaityas there. According to historical records, Palli Banapperumal was a favorite of the locals. His influence can be seen in Neelamperur and  Kilirur Padayanis.

Balachandran Chullikkadu
Balachandran Chullikkadu (born 1957) is a Malayali poet, orator and actor, who embraced Buddhism in 2000, becoming an ardent critic of Hinduism.

References

Buddhism in Kerala
Buddhism in India
Religion in Kerala